Battle of Deir ez-Zor may refer to:
 Battle of Deir ez-Zor (1941)
 Various battles/offensives in the Syrian Civil War (see Deir ez-Zor Governorate campaign)